The Battle of Lough Raska or Battle of Corcomroe took place on 15 August 1317 near Corcomroe Abbey in north County Clare, Ireland. It was part of a fight for control of the Uí Briain chieftaincy and part of the Anglo-Norman wars in Ireland. Forces loyal to Muircheartach Ó Briain were commanded by Diarmait Ó Briain in a pitched battle against Donnchadh Ó Briain, who was an ally of Mathghamhain Ó Briain and Richard de Clare. Both armies were about 9,000 men each. Diarmait Ó Briain's forces were victorious. This would be a precursor to the Battle of Dysert O'Dea.

References

Conflicts in 1317
Lough Raska
History of County Clare
1317 in Ireland
Lough Raska